Harry Glover may refer to:
 Harry Glover (artist), English artist in South Australia
 Henry H. Glover, his son, Australian artist, also called Harry
 Harry Glover (rugby union), English rugby union player